Howard Morgan Griffith (born March 15, 1958) is an American lawyer and politician who has been the U.S. representative for Virginia's 9th congressional district since 2011. The district covers a large swath of southwestern Virginia, including the New River Valley and the Virginia side of the Tri-Cities. He is a member of the Republican Party and the Freedom Caucus.

Griffith was the majority leader of the Virginia House of Delegates and represented the 8th district from 1994 to 2011. The district was based in his hometown of Salem and included parts of surrounding Roanoke County.

Early life, education, and career
Griffith was born in Philadelphia, Pennsylvania, and in his infancy his family relocated to Salem, Virginia. He graduated from Andrew Lewis High School in 1976 and from Emory and Henry College in 1980 with a Bachelor of Arts. Griffith completed his education with a J.D. from the Washington and Lee University School of Law in 1983.

After law school, Griffith settled in Salem, where he worked as an attorney in private practice specializing in traffic violations and DUI. On June 23, 2008, Albo & Oblon LLP, a law firm run by fellow Republican delegate Dave Albo, announced that Griffith had joined the firm as head of its new Roanoke/Salem office.

Early political career
Griffith's first entry into electoral politics came in 1986, when he was chosen as chair of the Salem Republican Party. He chaired the party from 1986 to 1988 and from 1991 to 1994.

Virginia House of Delegates
In 1993, incumbent Delegate G. Steven Agee chose to run in the Republican primary for Attorney General. Griffith ran for the open seat representing the 8th district and won. He was elected to several terms, facing opposition only in 2001, 2003, and 2009. He served as vice chair of the Rules Committee and on the Courts of Justice Committee, and chaired its Criminal Law Subcommittee. He also served on the Commerce and Labor Committee, and the Committee on Militia, Police, and Public Safety. He was elected House Majority Leader in 2000, the first Republican to hold that position in Virginia's history.

U.S. House of Representatives

Elections

2010

Rather than run for a tenth term in the House of Delegates, Griffith opted to challenge Congressman Rick Boucher, a 13-term incumbent Democrat who had served since 1983. His home in Salem was just outside the 9th's borders at the time, but the district included almost all of his House of Delegates district.

Griffith chose to run for Congress after Boucher voted for the cap and trade bill. Boucher capitalized on the fact that Griffith did not live in the district, and in return Griffith branded Boucher as a rubber stamp for Barack Obama and Nancy Pelosi. Griffith won the election by less than 5% of the vote.

2012

Griffith defeated Democratic nominee Anthony Flaccavento, 61.3% to 38.6%.

2016

Griffith defeated Democratic nominee Derek Kitts and Independent Janice Boyd with 68.59% of the vote.

2018

Griffith defeated two Democratic opponents, Flaccavento and Justin Santopietro, and a Whig opponent, Scott Blankenship.

2020

Griffith ran unopposed. He was reelected with 94.39% of the vote.

Committee assignments
 Committee on Energy and Commerce
 Subcommittee on Energy
 Subcommittee on Health
 Subcommittee on Oversight and Investigations

Caucus memberships
 Congressional Constitution Caucus
 Congressional Western Caucus
 Veterinary Medicine Caucus
 Freedom Caucus
 Liberty Caucus
Friends of Wales Caucus

Electoral history

Political positions

Iraq
In June 2021, Griffith was one of 49 House Republicans to vote to repeal the Authorization of Military Force against Iraq. The measure ultimately succeeded in the House and has been pending in the Senate since then.

Syria
In 2023, Griffith was among 47 Republicans to vote in favor of H.Con.Res. 21 which directed President Joe Biden to remove U.S. troops from Syria within 180 days.

Immigration
Griffith has voted to allow Virginia to enforce federal immigration laws to criminalize knowingly employing illegal immigrants or undocumented workers, and also voted to criminalize possession of firearms by illegal aliens.

Griffith voted against the Further Consolidated Appropriations Act of 2020 which authorizes DHS to nearly double the available H-2B visas for the remainder of FY 2020.

Griffith voted against the Consolidated Appropriations Act (H.R. 1158), which effectively prohibits Immigration and Customs Enforcement from cooperating with the Department of Health and Human Services to detain or remove illegal alien sponsors of Unaccompanied Alien Children. The measure was approved by both houses of Congress and signed into law by President Donald Trump on December 10, 2019.

Gay rights
While serving in the Virginia House of Delegates, Griffith supported a constitutional amendment to prohibit same-sex marriage by defining marriage as between one man and one woman. He voted in favor of a motion to effectively kill a bill to prohibit discrimination on the basis of sexual orientation for government employees in Virginia.

Environment 
In 2017, Griffith voted to nullify the Stream Protection Rule, which included improvements in the protection of water supplies, water quality, streams, fish and other wildlife that can be negatively affected by surface coal mining. The same year, he joined other members of the House of Representatives in passing an amendment to H.R. 3354, which undermined the Environmental Protection Agency’s ability to enforce environmental standards in the Chesapeake Bay watershed, which covers six states and the District of Columbia.

Griffith is a proponent of "an 'all of the above' energy strategy" that utilizes both fossil fuel and renewable energy sources. In 2011, he joined other GOP members in urging Interior Secretary Ken Salazar to reconsider the ban on offshore drilling off Virginia's coast.

Gun rights
Griffith voted in favor of several bills to reduce restrictions on gun ownership, including a bill to allow concealed weapons in vehicles without a permit and to allow concealed weapons permit holders to carry their firearms in restaurants and bars. He also voted to prohibit consumption of alcohol while in possession of a concealed weapon. In 2004 Griffith voted to prohibit carrying firearms or ammunition in non-secure areas of airport terminals, including baggage claim areas.

Health care
Early in 2010, Griffith voted in favor of a bill to prohibit any individual mandate to purchase health insurance. This law passed Virginia's legislature before the federal Patient Protection and Affordable Care Act was enacted, which Virginia has used to challenge the individual mandate in federal court. On July 17, 2013, Griffith was the lone GOP member of the House to vote against delaying the implementation of the individual mandate.

Just before the United States federal government shutdown of 2013, Griffith issued a press release in which he endorsed the final House version of Continuing Appropriations Resolution, 2014, which would have continued funding for federal government operations while delaying implementation of the Affordable Care Act. He voted against the Continuing Appropriations Act, 2014, the Senate-proposed compromise that ended the shutdown without defunding the ACA.

Death penalty
Griffith has consistently voted for expansions of the death penalty to include eligibility for accomplices to a murder, as well as for those who murder a judge or a witness.

Abortion
When surveyed in 1999 on his political positions by Project Vote Smart, Griffith indicated that he supports legalized abortion in the first trimester and to save the life of the mother, while favoring the restriction of abortion through parental notification laws and prohibition of partial-birth abortion. His voting record has generally been consistent with that survey, voting in favor of restrictions such as parental-notification and parental-consent, restricting state funding of abortions, and requiring abortion clinics to meet the same licensing requirements as surgical centers. In 2006 Griffith voted to restrict state funding for fetal stem cell research.

In 2007 Griffith voted against a bill in the Virginia General Assembly, HB 2797, which stated "That life begins at the moment of fertilization and the right to enjoyment of life guaranteed by Article 1, § 1 of the Constitution of Virginia is vested in each born and preborn human being from the moment of fertilization".

Griffith's 2010 campaign website reported that Griffith has a "100% pro-life" voting record and an "A" rating from the Virginia Society for Human Life (VSHL). But VSHL's report on 2007 legislation in Virginia omits reference to HB 2797. Project Vote Smart indicated that Griffith declined to retake their survey in 2010.

Taxes and spending
Griffith supports raising the retirement age and reducing the number of American troops serving overseas as means of reducing the federal budget deficit. Most recently, he voted for the Tax Cuts and Jobs Act of 2017.

Medical marijuana
In 2014, Griffith introduced legislation to move marijuana from a Schedule I to a Schedule II narcotic, which would effectively make the drug legal for medical purposes under federal law.

Texas v. Pennsylvania
In December 2020, Griffith was one of 126 Republican members of the House of Representatives to sign an amicus brief in support of Texas v. Pennsylvania, a lawsuit filed at the United States Supreme Court contesting the results of the 2020 presidential election, in which Joe Biden defeated incumbent Donald Trump. The Supreme Court declined to hear the case on the basis that Texas lacked standing under Article III of the Constitution to challenge the results of an election held by another state.

Presidential election certification

On January 6, 2021, Griffith was one of the 147 Republican members of Congress who objected to certifying the 2020 presidential election.

Defense
In September 2021, Griffith was among 75 House Republicans to vote against the National Defense Authorization Act of 2022, which contains a provision that would require women to be drafted.

Griffith was among 19 House Republicans to vote against the final passage of the 2022 National Defense Authorization Act.

Big Tech
In 2022, Griffith was one of 39 Republicans to vote for the Merger Filing Fee Modernization Act of 2022, an antitrust package that would crack down on corporations for anti-competitive behavior.

Personal life
Griffith and his wife, the former Hilary Davis, have three children. He is an Episcopalian.

In 2014 Griffith founded the Congressional Friends of Wales Caucus in honor of his Welsh heritage.

References

External links
 Congressman Morgan Griffith official U.S. House website
 Morgan Griffith for Congress
 
 H. Morgan Griffith at The Virginia Public Access Project
 Albo & Oblon L.L.P.

|-

|-

1958 births
21st-century American politicians
American Episcopalians
Episcopalians from Virginia
Emory and Henry College alumni
Living people
Republican Party members of the Virginia House of Delegates
People from Salem, Virginia
Politicians from Roanoke, Virginia
Republican Party members of the United States House of Representatives from Virginia
Virginia lawyers
Washington and Lee University School of Law alumni